Protocetus atavus ("first whale") is an extinct species of primitive cetacean from Egypt. It lived during the middle Eocene period 45 million years ago. The first discovered protocetid, Protocetus atavus was described by  based on a cranium and a number of associated vertebrae and ribs found in middle Lutetian Tethyan marine limestone from Gebel Mokattam near Cairo, Egypt.

Description
 

Many protocetids (like Maiacetus, Rodhocetus) possessed well developed innominates and hind limbs, often attached to the backbone with a sacrum. Protocetus are known to have had at least one sacral vertebrate, and likely possessed hind limbs and webbed toes. The shape of the bones in the tails suggests that it may have had a tail fluke like modern whales.

The head of Protocetus measured about 0.6 meters long. The jaws were long and lined with sharp teeth. While it did not have a true blowhole, the nostrils were placed further back on the head than in most land mammals. Unlike the more primitive Pakicetus, the structure of the ears suggests that Protocetus was able to hear properly underwater, although it is unlikely that it could echolocate. Similarly, it retained sufficient olfactory apparatus to have a good sense of smell, although it probably relied more on its eyesight to find prey.

See also 

 Evolution of cetaceans

References

Notes

Sources

 
 

Protocetidae
Prehistoric cetacean genera
Fossil taxa described in 1904
Paleogene mammals of Asia
Eocene mammals of Africa